The Portico: A Repository of Science & Literature (1816–1818) was a short-lived Baltimore literary journal founded and edited by Stephen Simpson and Tobias Watkins. The monthly journal was formed to publish the members of a small Baltimore literary society, called the Delphian Club. The Portico's contributors include John Pierpont, a poet, and John Neal, a poet, novelist, and journalist who went on to write for English periodicals such as Blackwood's Magazine and to serve as editor of several American papers.

The Portico regularly offered reviews of contemporary British and American works, humorous and serious essays on wide-ranging subjects, and original poetry and fiction. The journal's promotion of American literature through generous reviews of contemporary American works and authors made it one of the most important contributors to early American literary nationalism.

References

Defunct literary magazines published in the United States
Magazines established in 1816
Magazines disestablished in 1818
Magazines published in Baltimore